German submarine U-766 was a Type VIIC U-boat built for the navy (Kriegsmarine) of Nazi Germany during World War II. She was later incorporated in the French Navy, where she served as Laubie.

Design
German Type VIIC submarines were preceded by the shorter Type VIIB submarines. U-766 had a displacement of  when at the surface and  while submerged. She had two shafts and two  propellers.

U-766 was fitted with five  torpedo tubes (four fitted at the bow and one at the stern), fourteen torpedoes, one  SK C/35 naval gun, (220 rounds), one  Flak M42 and two twin  C/30 anti-aircraft guns. The boat had a complement of between forty-four and sixty.

Service history

Kriegsmarine
U-766 was launched in Wilhelmshaven on 29 May 1943, and was commissioned  on 30 July 1943 under the command Oberleutnant zur See Hans-Dietrich Wilke. She was part of the 8th U-boat Flotilla for training until 29 February 1944, when she was transferred to the frontline in the 6th U-boat flotilla.

She sailed five uneventful patrols.

She was de-commissioned at La Rochelle on 24 August 1944, and was surrendered on 8 May 1945.

Marine Nationale
In May 1945 U-766 was transferred to France and brought into French service under captain Brunet. In the process, she was also fitted with a snorkel. Her trials were accomplished by a mostly German crew composed of war prisoners, with Wilke acting as first officer.

U-766 was commissioned in 1946 as Laubie (pennant number: S610), in honour of Louis Laubie, an engineer killed in the wreck of the submarine .

Laubie was transferred to Toulon. On 17 July 1950, Laubie was accidentally rammed by the frigate Surprise as she was emerging. She managed to surface and return to Casablanca with a heavily damaged sail.

On 2 May 1960, Laubie was again rammed, this time by the liner Ville de Marseille, off Algiers. Her stern was damaged over 9 metres. Severely damaged, Laubie was decommissioned, and broken up in 1963.

References
Notes

Bibliography

External links

 section Rubis: (S 610) LAUBIE 
 francois.delboca.free.fr:LE LAUBIE ex U-766 

German Type VIIC submarines
Ships built in Wilhelmshaven
1943 ships
U-boats commissioned in 1943
World War II submarines of Germany
Captured U-boats
Foreign submarines in French service
Cold War submarines of France